Petryayevo is a rural locality (a selo) in Ibragimovsky Selsoviet, Chishminsky District, Bashkortostan, Russia. The population was 255 as of 2010. There are 4 streets.

Geography 
Petryayevo is located 39 km southeast of Chishmy (the district's administrative centre) by road. Adzitarovo is the nearest rural locality.

References 

Rural localities in Chishminsky District